Laurie Ann Haus is a world and classically trained solo and session vocalist for movies, video games.  She is also a solo musical artist with music released under her name Laurie Ann Haus  and with her band Todesbonden. Her vocals can heard on soundtracks for Starcraft II, World of Warcraft, Showtime's series The Borgias and more. She also created the Vocal Studio Series: Laurie library with the popular virtual instrument and sound library manufacturer 8Dio.

Biography
Laurie Ann Haus was born in Wheaton, Maryland. She began her musical career on the industry side by booking touring bands, she later attended college where we she majored in Vocal Performance, while attending college she begin to compose music for her band Todesbonden in 2000,  releasing her first EP, Stormbringer in 2003 and then "Sleep Now Quiet Forest" in 2008.

Since 2003 she has released a single under her artist name Laurie Ann Haus, The Wood Maiden and has made several guest appearances on soundtracks, the 8Dio Vocal Series: Laurie[4] synth vocal library and numerous musical groups of different genres ranging from world, new age, pop, metal to classical.

Musical influences 
Laurie's vocal influences are based in Celtic, Balkan, Middle Eastern, operatic and folk roots

Session vocals on video game and movie soundtracks

 (2018) Redbad, Composer- Trevor Morris
 (2018) The Great Barrier Reef, Composer - Dale Cornelius
 (2018) The Story of Earth Composer -Dale Cornelius
 (2018)  Starcraft 2: Legacy of the Void, Composer - Neal Acree
 (2015) Uranium: Twisting the Dragon's Tail,  Composer - Dale Cornelius
 (2014) World of Warcraft: Warlords of Draenor,  Lords of War: Part 5, Composer - Neal Acree
 (2014) Diablo 3: Reaper of Souls, Composer- Neal Acree
 (2014) Falcon Rising: Composer - Neal Acree
 (2013) JFK: The Smoking Gun , Composer-  Dale Cornelius
 (2013) Starcraft 2: Heart of the Swarm, Composer - Neal Acree
 (2013) The Infiltrators- Dirk Ehlert
 (2012) The Scorpion King: Battle for Redemption- Trevor Morris
 (2012) Australia on Trial, Composer - Dale Cornelius
 (2011) Showtime's Series, The Borgias (Season 1, Episode 5) Composer- Trevor Morris
 (2011) Assassination Games, Composer, Neal Acree
 (2011) Weapon, Composer - Neal Acree
 (2011) National Lampoon's: The Legend of Awesomest Maximus (Comedy Central) Composer -Scott Glasgow
 (2010) World of Warcraft: Cataclysm (Track 17 - Nightsong, Blizzard Entertainment) Composer - Neal Acree
 (2010) SyFy Channel Original Movie, Witchville, Composer- Neal Acree
 (2010) Starcraft 2: Wings of Liberty (Tracks Blizzard Entertainment) Composer Neal Acree
 (2010) Witchville (SyFy Channel), Composer: Neal Acree

Discography and Releases
With Laurie Ann Haus 

 The Wood Maiden -Single (2015)

With Todesbonden:

Sleep Now, Quiet Forest (2008)
Stormbringer (2003)

Vocal Library 

 8DIO Studio Vocal Series: Laurie  (Created by Laurie Ann Haus and 8Dio)

As guest vocalist 
With Realms of Odoric 

The Third Age (2018)

With Jo Blankenburg

Cronos (2017)

With Stephan Baer

 Song: Orphic

With Brand X (2016)

 Battle for Dawn- Song: Lumos

With Brand X (2016)

 Architect Series: ETHEREAL

With Driftmoon

(R)evolution (2016)

With Govinda

Decadence (2016)

With Tina Guo (2014)

 Composers for Charity, Composer Neal Acree, Song: Oceans of Time

With Saturnus

Saturn In Ascension (2012), Song: A Lonely Passage

Personal life 
Laurie Ann Haus lives with her husband, guitarist Jason Aaron Wood, in their home in Maryland.

References

External links 
 
 

Living people
American women singers
People from Wheaton, Maryland
Year of birth missing (living people)
American women heavy metal singers
21st-century American women